John Scott Keadle is a North Carolina Republican politician and a frequent candidate for office. He was a 2012 candidate for US House for North Carolina's 8th congressional district. Keadle lost in a primary run-off to former congressional aide Richard Hudson.

Keadle, a dentist by profession, founded Rowan Dental Associates in Rowan County, North Carolina, in 1990. Keadle is also the founder and president of Keadle Professional Properties, a commercial and residential real estate development company.

Early life

Keadle was born in Huntington, West Virginia, in 1964.  His father, Tom Keadle, is a retired sales manager in the coal mining equipment business, and his mother, Jean Miller Yates is a retired schoolteacher.

From Milton High School he went to the United States Air Force Academy and spent his freshman year there, majoring in chemistry. He received an honorable discharge from the US Air Force, and transferred to West Virginia University for his sophomore and junior years, continuing his undergraduate study of Chemistry.  He was granted early acceptance into the WVU School of Dentistry in 1985, and graduated with a Doctorate of Dental Surgery (DDS) in 1989.

Political career
Following an unsuccessful campaign for Rowan County Commissioner in 1996, he became active in the Republican Party, serving as county finance chairman and then vice-chairman.  In 1998, he won a highly contested primary  to become the Republican nominee for Congress in the heavily Democratic 12th congressional district, winning 43% of the vote against incumbent Democrat Mel Watt, the highest percentage ever received by a Republican in that district.  In 2000, he won the Republican nomination for the heavily Democratic 23rd Senate district in the North Carolina General Assembly, and narrowly lost in the general election.

He moved to Iredell County in 2003 and ran successfully for County Commissioner there in 2008.  He was lauded by colleagues and the press as a strong and dominant conservative voice on the County Board, fighting for leaner budgets, transparent government, and always doing his homework. He did not seek re-election in 2010, and his fellow commissioners honored his service with a special presentation. The Mooresville Tribune reported that Commissioner "Steve Johnson said he and Keadle may have disagreed on the issues, but he always respected Keadle for his honesty and integrity."

In 2010, Keadle unsuccessfully challenged incumbent Congressman Patrick McHenry in the Republican primary.  He was subsequently named as a regional chairman for the national conservative action group, Americans for Prosperity, and traveled throughout south central North Carolina speaking with and on behalf of conservatives. Americans For Prosperity North Carolina executive director Dallas Woodhouse said of Keadle: "As a commissioner and as a citizen, Scott has been a consistent voice for freemarkets, property rights, and the limited government principles that our members know will lead us to prosperity."

In July 2011, anticipating favorable re-configuration of the congressional district lines, Keadle began a campaign to unseat Democrat Larry Kissell in North Carolina's 8th Congressional District in 2012.  The Hill newspaper has since rated Kissell "the #1 most vulnerable incumbent in the country", and National Review called Keadle "a North Carolina Republican to watch".

Keadle's professional campaign organization includes noted advisor to Pat McCrory Jack Hawke as Lead Strategist, former NC GOP Executive Director Chris McClure, and Rick Perry advisor Walter Whetsell.

Recent electoral history

Community and family
Throughout his twenty years in North Carolina, Keadle has been active in community service organizations, including the CommunityCare Committee, Families for Kids, Stop Child Abuse Now, American Legion Post #185, the Boy Scouts, Civitans and Rotary. He is the team dentist for Catawba College and provides free dental services through the National Foundation of Dentistry for the Handicapped. He served one term each on the Rowan County and Iredell County health boards. Scott is an aerobatic pilot and experimental aircraft builder, and is a member of the Experimental Aircraft Association and the International Aerobatic Club. He is a member of the NRA and a life member of Grass Roots North Carolina, organizations dedicated to the preservation of the right to bear arms.

Scott and his wife Ming have two daughters.  They attend Cove Church in Mt. Mourne.

See also
 US House elections in NC, 2012

References

External links
 

1964 births
American dentists
Living people
North Carolina Republicans
Politicians from Huntington, West Virginia